Finlay Air Park  is located in Deerfield, Nova Scotia, Canada.

References

Registered aerodromes in Nova Scotia
Transport in Yarmouth County
Buildings and structures in Yarmouth County